Luis Fernando Vega Villacorta (born 28 February 2002) is a Honduran footballer currently playing as a midfielder for Marathón.

Career statistics

Club

Notes

References

Living people
2002 births
Honduran footballers
Honduras youth international footballers
Association football midfielders
Liga Nacional de Fútbol Profesional de Honduras players
C.D. Marathón players